Société Tunisienne de Banque is a state-controlled bank in Tunisia. It is listed in the Bourse de Tunis. It has 124,300 million dinars in assets. The participation in the bank's capital is as follows: public and semi-public sector (52.5%), private sector (36.2%) and foreign actors (11.3%).

Overview
Société Tunisienne de Banque was founded in 1958. It is headquartered in Tunis, Tunisia.

External links

References

Banks established in 1958
Banks of Tunisia
1958 establishments in Tunisia
Tunisian brands
Companies listed on the Bourse de Tunis
Government-owned companies of Tunisia
Government-owned banks